Blake M. Treinen (born June 30, 1988) is an American professional baseball pitcher for the Los Angeles Dodgers of Major League Baseball (MLB). He played college baseball for the Baker Wildcats and the South Dakota State Jackrabbits baseball team. The Oakland Athletics selected Treinen in the seventh round of the 2011 MLB draft, and he made his MLB debut in 2014. He has also played in MLB for the Athletics and Washington Nationals . Treinen was an All-Star in 2018 and won the 2020 World Series with the Dodgers over the Tampa Bay Rays.

Amateur career
Treinen attended Osage City High School in Osage City, Kansas. He played for the school's baseball team as a freshman, but quit during his sophomore year as he developed prediabetes. He returned to the team in his junior year, with his fastball reaching .

He enrolled at Baker University, where he played college baseball for the Baker Wildcats in the National Association of Intercollegiate Athletics in 2007. He transferred to the University of Arkansas in 2008, but did not play for its baseball team. He attempted to walk on to the Arkansas Razorbacks baseball team in the National Collegiate Athletic Association (NCAA), but was denied the opportunity to try out. He began weight training.

During Christmas break, Treinen participated in a baseball training camp led by Don Czyz, a retired Minor League Baseball pitcher. Czyz recommended Treinen to Ritchie Price, the head coach of the South Dakota State Jackrabbits baseball team. Treinen transferred to South Dakota State University to continue his college baseball career with the Jackrabbits. He had to sit out 2009 due to the NCAA's rules on transfers. By the time he was able to pitch for the Jackrabbits, his fastball averaged . The Miami Marlins selected Treinen in the 23rd round of the 2010 MLB draft. Though Treinen was willing to sign, an MRI revealed shoulder inflammation, and the Marlins withdrew the offer.

In 2011, his senior year, Treinen had a 7–3 win–loss record and a 3.00 earned run average (ERA). During the season, his fastball reached .

Professional career

Oakland Athletics (2011–2012)
The Oakland Athletics selected Treinen in the seventh round of the 2011 MLB draft. He signed with Oakland, receiving a $52,000 signing bonus. Pitching for the Stockton Ports of the Class A-Advanced California League in 2012, Treinen had a season he called "subpar" and "mediocre", in which he had a 4.37 ERA in 24 games pitched, 15 of which were starts.

Washington Nationals (2012-2017)
Before the 2013 season, the Athletics traded Treinen to the Washington Nationals in a three-team deal, in which Washington also received A. J. Cole and Ian Krol, Oakland received John Jaso, and the Seattle Mariners received Michael Morse. With the Harrisburg Senators of the Class AA Eastern League, Treinen had a 3.64 ERA during the 2013 season.

Major Leagues
The Nationals invited Treinen to spring training in 2014, where he impressed Nationals' coaches. He began the season with the Syracuse Chiefs of the Class AAA International League, and was promoted to the major leagues on April 12. He earned his first career win on June 29, making a spot start against the Chicago Cubs and out-dueling Jeff Samardzija in a 7–2 win. Splitting the season between the Nationals and the Chiefs, Treinen had a 2.49 ERA in 15 major league games and a 3.35 ERA in 16 minor league games.

For the 2015 season, Treinen started the year in the Nationals bullpen, with the off-season acquisition of Max Scherzer creating a crowded rotation picture. Manager Matt Williams, dealing with injuries to his veteran relievers, began inserting Treinen into high-leverage, late-game situations in early April, occasionally setting up for closer Drew Storen. He also reached  with his sinker for the first time in his major league career during the first half of the season.

Treinen remained with the Nationals for much of the year, posting a 3.86 ERA with a 2–5 record with 65 strikeouts for the season. He was optioned back to Syracuse on June 20 after struggling with command for the first half of the season. Upon being recalled the next month, Treinen told The Washington Post that being sent down "was probably the best thing that could have happened" in allowing him to work on his approach. However, even late into the season, Treinen was noted for struggling to retire left-handed batters, ultimately giving up the final run of the Nationals' season on a solo home run by left-hitting New York Mets outfielder Curtis Granderson in a 1–0 loss to the eventual World Series runners-up on October 4.

In the Nationals' 2016 season, Treinen posted a 2.28 ERA on the year and narrowed his platoon splits versus left-handed hitting. He credited veteran teammate Matt Belisle and the Nationals' new pitching coach, Mike Maddux, for helping him improve his craft, while Maddux described Treinen's progress over the course of the season as "puppy dog to bulldog". Treinen led the National League in groundballs induced with 65.9% on the season and ranked highly in inherited runners stranded and soft contact created, among other metrics. Treinen was frequently used in situations when another Nationals pitcher had allowed one or more baserunners and manager Dusty Baker was seeking a double play ball, a role in which he excelled with his high-90s sinker. He remained with the Nationals for the entire year, working exclusively out of the bullpen, and made his first playoff appearance for the team, being credited with the win in Game 2 of the Division Series against the Los Angeles Dodgers and taking the loss in Game 4.

With the departure of Mark Melancon to free agency, the Nationals named Treinen their closer for the 2017 season. On Opening Day, Treinen pitched a perfect inning in the top of the ninth against the Miami Marlins with two strikeouts to end the game, earning the save, the second of his career. The Opening Day performance was the first and last clean inning Treinen pitched in April. He gave up an earned run while notching his second save of the season on April 5 against the Marlins before blowing a save against the same team the following day. After just a couple of weeks as the closer in which he posted a 7.11 ERA, Treinen was removed from the role in favor of Shawn Kelley and later Koda Glover.

In June, Treinen's batting average on balls in play against him gradually regressed toward his career norms. But with both Kelley and Glover on the disabled list, fellow setup men Enny Romero and Matt Albers unavailable, and acting manager Chris Speier in need of a reliever to close out the ninth inning of a 4–2 game against the Chicago Cubs on June 29, Treinen was called upon for his first save opportunity since being demoted from the position of closer. He gave up three earned runs for a blown save as the Cubs came back to win 5–4.

Second stint with Athletics (2017–2019)
On July 16, 2017, the Nationals traded Treinen back to the Athletics, along with Sheldon Neuse and Jesus Luzardo, for Sean Doolittle and Ryan Madson. At the time of the trade he was 0–2 with a 5.73 ERA and three out of five in save opportunities converted over 37 appearances. As the Athletics' closer, he converted 13 of 16 save opportunities after the trade. In early September, Treinen took three losses in a row, and was on the hook for a fourth, but the A's rallied for two runs in the bottom of the ninth to walk off the Houston Astros 9-8, and Treinen got the win instead. Treinen recorded 13 saves with the A's in 2017, including his last 12 opportunities in a row after blowing three of his first four.

In the first half of the 2018 season, Treinen had a 5–1 record with an 0.79 ERA and 23 saves. He was named an All-Star. He finished the season with a 9-2 record, 38 saves (3rd in the AL), and an 0.78 ERA.

Treinen and the Athletics went into salary arbitration before the 2019 season, and Treinen won, earning a $6.4 million salary for the season.

On June 21, 2019, Treinen was placed on the 10-day injured list with soreness in his right shoulder after an appearance against the Tampa Bay Rays in which he gave up three runs without recording an out. He was activated on July 3, after which he ceded the role of closer to Liam Hendriks.

In 2019 he was 6-5 in 57 relief appearances with 16 saves and a 4.91 ERA, as he struck out 59 batters in 58.2 innings. On December 2, Treinen was non-tendered by Oakland and became a free agent.

Los Angeles Dodgers (2020–present)
On December 15, 2019, Treinen signed a one-year, $10 million contract with the Los Angeles Dodgers. The start of the 2020 season was delayed to late July by the COVID-19 pandemic, but Treinen appeared in 27 games for the Dodgers (3rd in the NL), with a 3–3 record with one save and a 3.86 ERA. In the postseason, he pitched one inning in the Wild Card series,  innings in the 2020 NLDS,  innings in the 2020 NLCS and  innings in the 2020 World Series, allowing six total runs and picking up a save in Game 5 of the World Series. The Dodgers won the championship in six games After the season, the Dodgers re-signed Treinen to a two-year, $17.5 million contract, which also included a team option for a third year.

Treinen pitched in 72 games for the Dodgers in 2021, with a 1.99 ERA, a 6–5 record, seven saves, 85 strikeouts and an MLB-leading 32 holds. In the playoffs, he pitched  scoreless innings in the Wild Card Game, allowed one run on one hit with five strikeouts in  innings in the 2021 NLDS and one run on three hits in  innings in the 2021 NLCS. He came down with a sore shoulder early in the 2022 season which shut him down for the first half of the season. Despite the injury, the Dodgers announced on May 22 that they had signed him to a one-year, $8 million, extension covering the 2023 season and included a conditional option for 2024. He pitched in five games for the Dodgers, allowing one run in five innings. He spent most of the season on the injured list, returning from his original injury only to quickly wind up going back on the list.

On November 11, 2022, Treinen underwent right shoulder labrum and rotator cuff repair surgery, with an estimated 10 month recovery.

Personal life
Treinen is married to Kati Treinen and owns a bulldog named Maxx. They have two children and live in Walla Walla, Washington, where Kati is an assistant women's basketball coach at Walla Walla Community College. He is a devout Christian.

References

External links

1988 births
Living people
American League All-Stars
People from Osage City, Kansas
Baseball players from Kansas
Major League Baseball pitchers
Washington Nationals players
Oakland Athletics players
Los Angeles Dodgers players
Baker Wildcats baseball players
South Dakota State Jackrabbits baseball players
Arizona League Athletics players
Burlington Bees players
Stockton Ports players
Harrisburg Senators players
Auburn Doubledays players
Syracuse Chiefs players
Oklahoma City Dodgers players